Philip Rowe (born July 18, 1990) is an American mixed martial artist who competes in the Welterweight division of the Ultimate Fighting Championship.

Background
Rowe went to Daytona State College, eventually becoming a Well Logging Engineer before undergoing a fighting career.

Mixed martial arts career

Early career
A professional since October 2014, Phil Rowe owns a 6-2 record on the regional scene with the wins being four submissions and two knockouts. After losing his first two bouts off his professional MMA career, via TKO in the first round against Roberto Yong at RITC 174 and via unanimous decision against Justin Lesko at XCC 20, Rowe won his first bout submitting Jeremy Bethea at House of Fame 4 via rear-naked choke in the second round. Rowe would go on to win his next 5 bouts on the regional scene all by first or second round stoppage, culminating at Island Fights 53, where he tapped out Matt McKeon in the second round.

Rowe was invited to compete at Dana White's Contender Series 25 on August 20, 2019 against Leon Shahbazyan. He won the bout and an UFC contract via third round TKO.

Ultimate Fighting Championship
Phil Rowe was briefly linked to a welterweight bout with Laureano Staropoli at UFC on ESPN: Ngannou vs. Rozenstruik on March 28, 2020. However, Rowe was removed from the card in late February for undisclosed reasons and replaced by Khaos Williams.

Rowe was briefly linked to a bout with promotional newcomer Matthew Semelsberger at UFC on ESPN: Munhoz vs. Edgar on August 22, 2020. However, Rowe pulled out of the bout citing a toe injury and was replaced by Carlton Minus.

Rowe made his UFC debut against Gabriel Green at UFC 258 on February 13, 2021. He lost the bout via unanimous decision.

In his sophomore performance, Rowe faced Orion Cosce on July 31, 2021 at  UFC on ESPN: Hall vs. Strickland. At the weigh-ins, Rowe weighed in at 173.5 pounds, two and half pounds over the welterweight non-title fight limit. His bout proceeded at a catchweight and he was fined 20% of his individual purse, which went to his opponent Orion Cosce. He won the bout via TKO stoppage in the second round.

Rowe faced Jason Witt on February 5, 2022 at UFC Fight Night: Hermansson vs. Strickland. He won the fight via technical knockout in round two.

Rowe was scheduled to face Abubakar Nurmagomedov on July 16, 2022 at UFC on ABC: Ortega vs. Rodríguez. However, the pairing was cancelled due to complications on both sides. Rowe has been forced to withdraw due to an injury, while Nurmagomedov is dealing with visa issues.

Rowe faced Niko Price  on  December 3, 2022, at UFC on ESPN 42. In a third round comeback, Rowe won the bout via TKO stoppage.

Mixed martial arts record

|-
| Win
| align=center|10–3
|Niko Price
|TKO (punches)
|UFC on ESPN: Thompson vs. Holland
|
|align=center|3
|align=center|3:26
|Orlando, Florida, United States
|
|-
| Win
| align=center|9–3
| Jason Witt
|TKO (punches)
| UFC Fight Night: Hermansson vs. Strickland
| 
| align=center|2
| align=center|2:15
| Las Vegas, Nevada, United States
|
|-
| Win
| align=center|8–3
| Orion Cosce
|TKO (punches)
|UFC on ESPN: Hall vs. Strickland
|
|align=center|2
|align=center|4:21
|Las Vegas, Nevada, United States
| 
|-
| Loss
| align=center|7–3
| Gabriel Green
| Decision (unanimous)
|UFC 258
|
| align=center|3
| align=center|5:00
|Las Vegas, Nevada, United States
|
|-
| Win
| align=center|7–2
| Leon Shahbazyan
| TKO (punches)
| Dana White's Contender Series 25
| 
| align=center|3
| align=center|0:16
| Las Vegas, Nevada, United States
| 
|-
| Win
| align=center| 6–2
| Matt McKeon
| Submission (guillotine choke)
| Island Fights 53
| 
| align=center| 2
| align=center| 2:34
| Ft. Walton Beach, Florida, United States
| 
|-
| Win
| align=center| 5–2
| Andrew Hellner
|Submission (guillotine choke)
|Battleground MMA
|
|align=center| 1
|align=center| 2:19
|Largo, Florida, United States
|
|-
| Win
| align=center| 4–2
|Cole Milani
| TKO (punches)
| CageSport 50
| 
| align=center| 1
| align=center| 0:41
| Tacoma, Washington, United States
|
|-
| Win
| align=center| 3–2
| Josh Zuckerman
| Submission (rear-naked choke)
| V3 Fights 64
| 
| align=center|1
| align=center|2:59
| Tampa, Florida, United States
| 
|-
| Win
| align=center| 2–2
| Ian Brofsky
| TKO (punches)
|PA Cage Fight 27
|
| align=center|2
| align=center|1:28
|Wilkes Barre, Pennsylvania, United States
|
|-
| Win
| align=center| 1–2
| Jeremy Bethea
|Submission (rear-naked choke)
|House of Fame 4
|
| align=center|2
| align=center|2:22
|Jacksonville, Florida, United States
|
|-
| Loss
| align=center|0–2
| Justin Lesko
| Decision (unanimous)
|XCC 20
|
| align=center|3
| align=center|5:00
|Philadelphia, Pennsylvania, United States
|
|-
| Loss
| align=center|0–1
| Roberto Yong
| TKO (punches)
|RITC 174
|
|align=center|1
|align=center|2:05
|Phoenix, Arizona, United States
|

See also 
 List of current UFC fighters
 List of male mixed martial artists

References

External links 
  
  

1990 births
Living people
American male mixed martial artists
Welterweight mixed martial artists
Ultimate Fighting Championship male fighters